Nagol is a village in Andorra, located in the parish of Sant Julià de Lòria.

Populated places in Andorra
Sant Julià de Lòria